An optical pulsar is a pulsar which can be detected in the visible spectrum.  There are very few of these known: the Crab Pulsar was detected by stroboscopic techniques in 1969, shortly after its discovery in radio waves, at the Steward Observatory. The Vela Pulsar was detected in 1977 at the Anglo-Australian Observatory, and was the faintest star ever imaged at that time.

Six known optical pulsars are listed by Shearer and Golden (2002):

References

External links
"A Pulsar Discovery: First Optical Pulsar." Moments of Discovery, American Institute of Physics, 2007 (Includes audio and teachers guides).

 
Star types